Nebraska Medicine (formerly, The Nebraska Medical Center, Nebraska Health System), is a private not-for-profit American healthcare company based in Omaha, Nebraska. The company was created as Nebraska Health System (NHS) in 1997, when Bishop Clarkson Hospital merged with the adjacent University Hospital in midtown Omaha. Renamed The Nebraska Medical Center in 2003, in 2014 the company merged with UNMC Physicians and Bellevue Medical Center to become Nebraska Medicine. The company has full ownership of two hospitals and 39 specialty and primary care clinics in and around Omaha, with partial ownership in two rural hospitals and a specialty hospital. Nebraska Medicine's main campus, Nebraska Medicine – Nebraska Medical Center, has 718 beds, while its Bellevue Medical Center campus has 91 beds.

The company operates the largest of only four dedicated biocontainment units in the United States, and is particularly recognized for programs in fields such as organ transplantation, cancer treatment, gastroenterology, neurology, neurosurgery, COPD, heart bypass surgery, heart failure treatment, and hip replacement. Ranked the No. 1 hospital in Nebraska and in Omaha by U.S. News & World Report in 2019, the publication also ranked Nebraska Medicine No. 35 in the United States for cancer and the best hospital in Nebraska. Nebraska Medicine operates as an independent clinical partner of the University of Nebraska Medical Center.

History

1869–1996: Nebraska Health System
Nebraska Medicine's predecessor company, Nebraska Health System (NHS), was formed in 1997 through the merger of Bishop Clarkson Memorial Hospital and University Hospital. Adjacent to the University of Nebraska's medical campus in midtown Omaha; both founding entities had been active in Nebraska for some time. Clarkson Hospital had been founded in 1869 and University Hospital in 1917, making Nebraska Health System the oldest healthcare organization in the state of Nebraska. In 1998, Nebraska Health System opened the Lied Transplant Center on its Omaha campus.

2003–2013: The Nebraska Medical Center
Nebraska Health System was renamed The Nebraska Medical Center in 2003, with the adjacent University of Nebraska Medical Center (UNMC) remaining its primary clinical partner. UNMC had been founded in 1881 as the Omaha Medical College before associating with the University of Nebraska system. In 2005, The Nebraska Medical Center opened the Nebraska Biocontainment Unit (NBU) as a collaboration with UNMC, also opening the Hixson-Lied Center on the Omaha campus. The Nebraska Medical Center's nearby Village Pointe Cancer Center opened in 2008. Nebraska Medicine was named one of the best hospitals in U.S. News & World Report’s 2008 publication for Cancer and Neurology & Neurosurgery. In 2010, The Nebraska Medical Center opened Bellevue Medical Center, a secondary hospital in nearby Bellevue, Sarpy County. The following year, the company began to implement a new $87 million electronic health record system.

2014–2016: Nebraska Medicine
In October 2014, it was announced that The Nebraska Medical Center, Bellevue Medical Center and UNMC Physicians would begin operating under Nebraska Medicine as one entity. UNMC Physicians, a clinical group formed in 1971, brought 39 ambulatory clinics and a physician's practice into Nebraska Medicine. The hospitals and clinics within the Nebraska Medicine network were also renamed, as Nebraska Medicine – Nebraska Medical Center, Nebraska Medicine – Bellevue, Nebraska Medicine – Village Pointe, Nebraska Medicine – Eagle Run, and others. UNMC remained independent, but changed its branding to reflect the new Nebraska Medicine logo.

On March 23, 2015, Rosanna Morris was named interim CEO of Nebraska Medicine and Bradley Britigan was made interim president. Daniel DeBehnke succeeded as CEO and president in May 2016. In 2016, Nebraska Medicine finished an expansion of its Village Pointe location, expanding on an outpatient surgery center and clinics.

Nebraska Medicine paid $130 million in January 2016 to fully purchase Bellevue Medical Center, which it had previously been leasing. At the time, Nebraska Medicine also was partial owner of the Nebraska Orthopaedic Hospital in Omaha. In February 2016, Nebraska Medicine reached Stage 7 on the Electronic Medical Record Adoption Model (EMRAM) developed by HIMSS Analytics. In 2016, Nebraska Medicine finished an expansion of its Village Pointe location, expanding on an outpatient surgery center and clinics. After physicians at Internal Medical Associates requested the merge, in July 2016, Nebraska Medicine assumed operations of Internal Medical Associates in Grand Island, Nebraska.

2017–2019: Recent developments
In January 2017, Nebraska Medicine announced that it would open Chalco Health Center in Chalco, as a primary care clinic and its fourth immediate care location, at which point it had around 40 clinic locations. That May, Nebraska Medicine opened the Fred & Pamela Buffett Cancer Center, a partly public partnership with various state and county investors. In September 2017, Nebraska Medicine closed its burn unit due to reduced patient volume. Opened in 1995, the unit had treated 100 burn patients annually. In August 2018, James Linder was appointed CEO. Nebraska Medicine and UNMC sent a team of infectious disease experts to Uganda in September 2018 to train local healthcare workers. At that time, Nebraska Medicine was also "working with several Nebraska hospitals to help implement electronic medical records." Nebraska Medicine had previously provided regional laboratory services to local hospitals, since 1998, also maintaining related records.

In 2018, the Nebraska Medicine network had 809 licensed beds. In 2018, Elkhorn Health Center, as well as a new building for Fontenelle Health Center, opened. Nebraska Medicine moved its Clarkson Family Medicine Clinic to a larger building in downtown Omaha, also performing the first bloodless stem cell transplant in the state. By 2019, some Nebraska Medicine hospital rooms featured virtual reality headsets to teach patients about procedures. Nebraska Medicine served as an organizer of the Flood Relief Donation Management Center that March, collecting donated items from corporations to help with relief efforts for flooding in Nebraska. Nebraska Medicine was awarded the "Nebraska's Safest Companies" award from the Nebraska chapter of the National Safety Council, in 2019. In June 2019, Nebraska Medicine was also named the best employer in Nebraska by Forbes. In December 2019, Nebraska Medicine announced it was planning a new facility to increase capacity for research and patient care, as well as "handle not only high-risk biological hazards like Ebola, but also chemical, radioactive, and environmental hazards." Dubbed the NExt project for "Nebraska Transformational Towers," the project will involve several towers on the northwest corner of the medical center campus, with a cost of between $1 and $2 billion.

2020: COVID-19 pandemic response 

During the early stages of the COVID-19 pandemic, in February 2020, Nebraska Medicine partnered with the federal government to evacuate Americans in Wuhan, China. 57 evacuees were quarantined in Camp Ashland, with Nebraska Medicine on standby to treat patients who developed symptoms. One patient was tested for a cough at the Nebraska Medical Center campus, but tested negative for COVID-19. Later that month, Nebraska Medicine was involved in training personnel and then testing and transporting American evacuees from the Diamond Princess cruise ship in Japan. With 14 evacuees testing positive, mildly ill patients were placed in the National Quarantine Unit (NQU) and sicker patients placed in the Nebraska Biocontainment Unit (NBU), both on Nebraska Medicine's medical campus. By February 20, 11 of the 13 evacuees treated by Nebraska Medicine were confirmed to have COVID-19, with 10 people in the quarantine unit and 3 in the biocontainment unit. Performing a study in both units, Nebraska Medicine found high levels of the virus on surfaces and in the air of rooms of COVID-19 patients, providing "evidence that the disease might spread by both direct contact, as well as indirect contact, such as touching a contaminated object, or contracting the virus through airborne transmission" as an aerosol.

It was announced on March 7, 2020 that Nebraska Medicine's Biocontainment Unit was treating the first travel-related COVID-19 patient in Nebraska, a woman who had returned from England to Douglas County. On March 12, 2020, all Nebraska Medicine-related travel for faculty, providers, and students was suspended immediately to "slow the progression of COVID-19 in our community and protect our patients, families and each other from infection with COVID-19," with the policy to be reassessed every one to two months. Several days later Nebraska Medicine began rescheduling non-urgent procedures due to the pandemic, and on March 26, Nebraska Medicine announced it was restricting visitors at its hospitals and clinics. Also that month, Nebraska Medicine developed, tested, and implemented protocols for decontaminating and re-using N95 respirator masks with UV light, sharing the protocol with other hospitals seeking to conserve masks during a shortage of personal protective equipment.

After UNMC developed a plastic shield that could be placed around patients being intubated to protect physicians from COVID-19 in April 2020, the boxes were put in Nebraska Medical Center's ICU and operating rooms, and also donated to other medical systems. The Nebraska Medical Center in April 2020 also began using the Infectious Aerosol Capture Mask, which was developed by UNMC to contain particles released by patients in operating and recovery rooms. In April 2020, Nebraska Medicine also set up a COVID-19 hotline and medical tents outside Nebraska Medical Center to screen patients for COVID-19, with the nearby emergency room also setting up a designated area for patients with critical COVID-19 issues. By that time, Nebraska Medicine and UNMC were collaborating on playbooks to "provide best practices and recommendations for meat processing facilities to minimize the risk that COVID-19," sending experts to tour meatpacking plants and provide technical assistance. They also created playbooks for school and teachers. In April 2020, Nebraska Medicine began leading the first clinical trial of remdesivir, a potential treatment for COVID-19, with clinical trial patients housed in Nebraska Medicine's biocontainment unit. After early phases of the trial showed success, Nebraska Medicine opened a third phase in August 2020.

Operations and staff
Nebraska Medicine's primary care clinics use a "patient-centered medical home model of care," which involves giving patients a "team" of healthcare providers, including "primary care doctors, pharmacists, nutritionists, behavioral health professionals and other providers", such as social workers and dietitians. Primarily serving the metro Omaha area and several counties in Iowa, in 2019, it had 33,606 discharges, 1.06 million outpatient visits, and 95,040 emergency room visits.

Nebraska Medicine operates emergency departments out of its two major hospitals in Omaha and Bellevue. Nebraska medicine's main campus, Nebraska Medical Center, is located in midtown Omaha and anchored by several multi-story buildings and facilities. Additional facilities in Omaha include nine outpatient clinics, Nebraska Orthopaedic Hospital and Bellevue Medical Center. Overall the company has 809 licensed beds. Primarily serving the metro Omaha area and several counties in Iowa, in 2019, it had 31,004 discharges, 426,923 outpatient visits, and 91,800 emergency room visits.

Certifications and programs
In 2019, U.S. News & World Report ranked Nebraska Medicine as the best regional hospital in Nebraska. It also ranked highly in the treatment of cancer, gastroenterology, neurology, neurosurgery, COPD, colon cancer surgery, heart bypass surgery, heart failure treatment, and hip replacement. The company has full ownership of two hospitals and 39 specialty and primary care clinics in and around Omaha, with partial ownership in two rural hospitals and a specialty hospital. Nebraska Medicine's main campus, Nebraska Medicine – Nebraska Medical Center, has 718 beds, while its Bellevue Medical Center campus has 91 beds. The company operates the largest of only four dedicated biocontainment units in the United States, and is particularly recognized for programs in fields such as organ transplantation cancer treatment, gastroenterology, neurology, neurosurgery, COPD, heart bypass surgery, heart failure treatment, and hip replacement. Ranked the No. 1 hospital in Nebraska and in Omaha by U.S. News & World Report in 2019. The publication also ranked Nebraska Medicine No. 35 in the United States for cancer and the best hospital in Nebraska.

Nebraska Medicine is known internationally for bone marrow and organ transplantation. Nebraska Medicine's stroke program, heart failure program and acute myocardial infarction program received the "Gold Seal of Approval" certification from The Joint Commission in 2017. The Joint Commission also certified the company in inpatient diabetes and lung transplantation in 2017, and the Comprehensive Epilepsy Center at Nebraska Medicine was certified as a level 4 epilepsy center by the National Association of Epilepsy Centers, the highest rating.

Facilities

Outpatient and immediate care clinics

Nebraska Medicine operates two hospitals and 39 specialty and primary care clinics. It also operates five immediate care clinics in Omaha and surrounding cities: Chalco Health Center, Eagle Run Health Center, Family Medicine at Bellevue Clinic, Midtown Health Center, and Plattsmouth Immediate Care Clinic in Plattsmouth.

Nebraska Medical Center

Commonly known as Nebraska Medical Center, Nebraska Medical Center serves as Nebraska Medicine's main campus. Located in midtown Omaha, it is the largest hospital in Nebraska, with 718 beds, as of 2019. It is licensed as an acute-care facility with an emergency department and a number of specialty clinics, and employs physicians in "all major specialties and services". The facility is the primary teaching hospital for Nebraska Medicine's academic partner, University of Nebraska Medical Center and, although they share campuses, they operate independently. A number of buildings on the Nebraska Medical Center campus are operated by UNMC, for example the Eppley Cancer Institute. In 2018, Becker's Hospital Review named Nebraska Medicine – Nebraska Medical Center to its "100 Great Hospitals in America" list for the fifth consecutive year, ranking again in 2019.

Some notable Nebraska Medicine-affiliated facilities on the Nebraska Medical Center campus include:

Fred & Pamela Buffett Cancer Center – Associated with both Nebraska Medicine and UNMC, Nebraska Medicine and UNMC spent $323 million on the center's construction, which opened to the public in June 2017.
Nebraska Biocontainment Unit –  The Nebraska Biocontainment Unit (NBU), in the Nebraska Medical Center, is a collaboration between Nebraska Medicine, UNMC, and the Nebraska Department of Health and Human Services. Commissioned in 2005 by the United States Centers for Disease Control, it is the largest of the four dedicated biocontainment units in the United States, with a 10-bed isolation unit. Staff in the unit train other healthcare practitioners on handling highly infectious diseases.
Clarkson College – Affiliated with Nebraska Medicine, Clarkson College is a nursing school on the Nebraska Medical Center campus.
Hixson-Lied Center for Clinical Excellence – The Nebraska Medical Center broke ground on the project in 2002, opening the $56.5 million facility to the public in 2005.
Diabetes Center – The Diabetes Center at Nebraska Medicine combines counseling, education, research, and clinical care in treating diabetes. It opened in 2008.
Lied Transplant Center – A partnership between UNMC and Nebraska Medicine, Lied Transplant Center was first built in 1999. The building houses a clinic, research labs and inpatient hospital units.
Lauritzen Outpatient Center – Opened in 2016, it has an ambulatory surgery center, clinics, a pharmacy and a laboratory.

Bellevue Medical Center
In 2010, Nebraska Medicine partnered with UNMC Physicians and a group of physicians from Bellevue, Nebraska to open that city's first civilian hospital.

Village Pointe Health Center
The Village Pointe Health Center hospital campus is located near Village Pointe shopping center, with services in three buildings, including a number of specialty clinics.

OrthoNebraska
Nebraska Orthopaedic Hospital opened in April 2004 under the ownership of several practicing orthopedic surgeons and Nebraska Medicine, which remained a partial owner when it was renamed OrthoNebraska, in 2017.

See also
 Hospitals in Omaha, Nebraska
 History of Omaha, Nebraska

References

External links
Nebraska Medicine
Nebraska Medical Center
University of Nebraska Medical Center
Bellevue Medical Center
Nebraska Orthopaedic Hospital
Clarkson College

Hospitals in Omaha, Nebraska
1997 establishments in Nebraska
Midtown Omaha, Nebraska
Hospitals established in 1997
Health facilities that treated Ebola patients
Healthcare in Omaha, Nebraska